Seyed Ahmad Alenemeh (born 20 October 1982) is an Iranian professional footballer who plays as a defender for Iranian club Esteghlal Khuzestan.

Club career
Alenemeh moved to Sepahan for the 2009–10 season, where he played as the club's main left-back. He moved to Shahin Bushehr the season after, and stayed there for a season before joining Tractor, where he help the club finish in second place. In the summer of 2012, Alenemeh joined Naft Tehran. In 2014 Alenemeh led Naft to a third place league finish and an Asian Champions League qualification.

On 14 July 2014, Alenemeh returned to Tractor, signing a contract until 2019.

International career

Alenemeh started playing for Iran in the 2008 WAFF Championship. On 1 June 2014, he was called into Iran's 2014 FIFA World Cup squad by Carlos Queiroz.

Career statistics

Club
Last Update: 22 October 2014

International 
Scores and results list Iran's goal tally first, score column indicates score after each Alenemeh goal.

Honours

Club
Sepahan
Iran Pro League: 2009–10

Naft Tehran
Hazfi Cup: 2016–17

Country
Iran
WAFF Championship: 2008

References

External links

1982 births
Living people
Iranian footballers
Iran international footballers
Esteghlal Ahvaz players
Foolad FC players
Sepahan S.C. footballers
Niroye Zamini players
Shahin Bushehr F.C. players
Tractor S.C. players
Naft Tehran F.C. players
Shahr Khodro F.C. players
2014 FIFA World Cup players
People from Ahvaz
Association football defenders
Sportspeople from Khuzestan province